Novoberyozovo is a rural locality (a village) in Ivanovskoye Rural Settlement, Kovrovsky District, Vladimir Oblast, Russia. The population was 10 as of 2010.

Geography 
Novoberyozovo is located 55 km south of Kovrov (the district's administrative centre) by road. Shevinskaya is the nearest rural locality.

References 

Rural localities in Kovrovsky District